Matthew John Jurman is an Australian soccer player who plays as a centre-back and captains A-League club Newcastle Jets.

Club career

Youth career
After graduating from Westfields Sports High School in 2007, Jurman furthered his football development at the AIS before signing for the Sydney FC youth team in 2008. In his first year at the club, Jurman helped Sydney FC to their first youth championship in the competition's inaugural campaign and later earned himself a senior deal at the club under then manager, John Kosmina.

Sydney FC

Jurman made his senior debut for Sydney FC off the bench on 9 September 2007 against Perth Glory. Throughout his time at Sydney, he went on to make 22 appearances in the league as well as a number of appearances for the club in the 2011 Asian Champions League. He scored his only goal for Sydney in a 2–1 away loss to Kashima Antlers.

Along with a strong finish to the season where he became a first team regular, Jurman is remembered for an incident that occurred during the 2010–11 season after Sydney FC striker Juho Mäkelä scored a crucial goal to put Sydney FC 2–0 ahead over Gold Coast United. Mäkelä jumped the fence to celebrate with the club's fans followed by the rest of the squad. During the jubilant celebrations, the fence collapsed and pinned Jurman's causing fears that he may have broken his leg. Jurman eventually played on and confirmed after the game that there was moderate swelling and bruising but no significant damage sustained.

Brisbane Roar
On 10 February 2011, it was confirmed Jurman had signed for A-League club Brisbane Roar on a two-year contract. He would be available for the beginning of the 2011–12 season. He won another league championship the first season and left after the second season to re join Sydney FC.

Return to Sydney FC
On 2 May 2013, Sydney FC announced that Jurman would be returning to the club for a second stint after signing a 1-year deal to join the Sky Blues. Jurman made his first appearance in the 2013–14 season for Sydney away to Melbourne Heart as a 64th-minute substitute for Brett Emerton in a game that Sydney FC won 2–0. On 8 March 2014 Jurman scored his first ever A-League goal with a 59th-minute header to level the Sydney Derby at 1–1 after Shinji Ono's opening goal. Sydney FC would go on to win the game 3–1, their first ever home derby win.

Suwon Samsung Bluewings
On 3 January 2017, Sydney FC confirmed that Jurman had been released, allowing him to join South Korean side Suwon Samsung Bluewings.

During Jurmans time with the Suwons he received the K-League Newcomer of the Year Award after a fantastic season with the team.

Al-Ittihad
On 9 July 2018, the Saudi Arabia Professional League team Al-Ittihad Club (Jeddah) announced Jurman would be joining them in Jeddah for the 2018–19 season.

International career
Jurman was first called up to the Australian squad in August 2017. He made his senior international debut on 5 October 2017 against Syria in a 2018 World Cup qualifier which finished in a 1–1 draw. In May 2018 he was named in Australia's 23-man squad for the 2018 World Cup in Russia.

Career statistics

1 – includes A-League final series statistics
2 – AFC Champions League statistics are included in season ending during group stages (i.e. ACL 2007 and A-League season 2006–07 etc.); also includes 2005 OFC Club Championship statistics

Honours
Sydney FC
 A-League Championship: 2009–10
 A-League Premiership: 2009–10

Brisbane Roar
 A-League Championship: 2012–13

Australia
 AFF U-19 Youth Championship: 2008

Individual
 Sydney FC Player of the Season: 2015–16

References

External links

Football-lineups profile

1989 births
Living people
Sportspeople from Wollongong
Association football central defenders
Australian soccer players
Australia international soccer players
Australian people of Croatian descent
Australian expatriate soccer players
Australian expatriate sportspeople in South Korea
Expatriate footballers in South Korea
Expatriate footballers in Saudi Arabia
A-League Men players
K League 1 players
Saudi Professional League players
Sydney Olympic FC players
Sydney FC players
Brisbane Roar FC players
Parramatta FC players
Ittihad FC players
Western Sydney Wanderers FC players
Xanthi F.C. players
Newcastle Jets FC players
Australian Institute of Sport soccer players
Suwon Samsung Bluewings players
2018 FIFA World Cup players
2019 AFC Asian Cup players
Australian expatriate sportspeople in Saudi Arabia